The Geoffrey Barker Medal, first awarded in 1988, is given by the Royal Society of Chemistry to scientists working in the UK or Ireland in recognition of their contributions to electrochemistry. The winner is invited to give a plenary lecture at that year's Electrochem meeting.

Laureates
Source: RSC

See also

 List of chemistry awards

References

Awards of the Royal Society of Chemistry